Filatima prognosticata is a moth of the family Gelechiidae. It is found in North America, where it has been recorded from Utah.

The larvae feed on Ribes longflorum.

References

Moths described in 1925
Filatima